Teymuraz Gabashvili was the defending champion; however, he chose not to play this year.
Florian Mayer defeated Dustin Brown 6–2, 6–4 in the final.

Seeds

Draw

Final four

Top half

Bottom half

References
 Main Draw
 Qualifying Draw

Baden Open - Singles